The Eight Hundred is a 2020 Chinese historical war drama film directed by and co-written by Guan Hu, and starring Huang Zhizhong, Oho Ou, Jiang Wu, Zhang Yi, Wang Qianyuan, Du Chun,  Vision Wei, Li Chen, Yu Haoming, Tang Yixin, and Zheng Kai. The film is based on real life events: the defense of Sihang Warehouse in 1937 Shanghai by Chinese NRA troops during the Battle of Shanghai and the Second Sino-Japanese War.

Originally scheduled for release in July 2019, the premiere and the release was moved to August 21, 2020, nationwide release. The film was a critical and commercial success, grossing $461 million worldwide, making it the second highest-grossing film of 2020.

Plot
During the early days of the Second Sino-Japanese War, and on a greater scale World War II, the Imperial Japanese Army invaded Shanghai in what became known as the Battle of Shanghai. After holding back the Japanese for over 3 months, and suffering heavy losses, the Chinese army was forced to retreat due to the danger of being encircled. Lieutenant Colonel  Xie Jinyuan of the 524th Regiment of the under-equipped 88th Division of the National Revolutionary Army, led 452 young officers and soldiers to defend Sihang Warehouse against the 3rd Imperial Japanese Division consisting of around 20,000 troops on a heroic suicidal last stand against the Japanese under an order by Generalissimo of Nationalist China, Chiang Kai-shek. The decision was made to provide a morale boost to the Chinese people after the losses of Beijing and Shanghai, and helped spur support from the Western powers, who were in full view of the battle from the International Settlement in Shanghai just across the Suzhou Creek.

Cast
 Huang Zhizhong as Lao Hulu
 Zhang Junyi as Xiao Hubei
 Oho Ou as Duan Wu
 Du Chun as Lieutenant Colonel Xie Jinyuan
 Zhang Cheng as company commander Lei Xiong
 Wang Qianyuan as Yang Guai
 Jiang Wu as Lao Tie,
 Zhang Yi as Lao Suanpan
 Zhang Youhao as Xiao Qiyue
 Vision Wei as Zhu Shengzhong
 Tang Yixin as Yang Huimin
 Hideo Nakaizumi as Colonel Konoe Isao 
 Li Jiuxiao as Dao Zi
 Hou Yong as the professor
 Liang Jing as the professor's wife
 Li Chen as a soldier
 Xu Jiawen (Augusta Xu-Holland) as Eva
 Yu Kailei as Luo Yangchan
 Xin Baiqing as Fang Xingwen
 Cao Weiyu as Yu Hongjun
 Yu Haoming as Shangguan Zhibiao, company commander
 Liu Xiaoqing as Sister Rong
 Yao Chen as He Xiangning
 Zheng Kai as Chen Shusheng, deputy squad leader
 Huang Xiaoming

Production
Guan Hu had been preparing for the film for 10 years. The Eight Hundred is the first Chinese film or commercial Asian film shot entirely on IMAX cameras.

Principal photography started on 9 September 2017 and wrapped on 27 April 2018.

Soundtrack
A theme song for the film titled "Remembering" (苏州河) was written by Bob Ezrin, Shridhar Solanki, Cheng Zhang and Isabel Yue Yin based on the melody of the Londonderry Air and was performed by Andrea Bocelli and Na Ying. The theme song had both an English and Mandarin version. The theme song was accompanied by the film's main theme and score written by Rupert Gregson-Williams and Andrew Kawczynski.

Release
The film was originally scheduled to premiere on 15 June 2019 during the prestigious opening slot of the Shanghai International Film Festival but was pushed back to 5 July, due to "consultation between the production team and other entities". Before the withdrawal, the Chinese Red Culture Research Association, a non-governmental group, held an academic conference on filmmaking where attendees voiced opinions on the film. Attendees did not agree with the portrayal of the National Revolutionary Army, saying the film failed to portray "the class oppression within the ranks of the Kuomintang army, the misdeeds of its officers and its evil oppression of the people". According to a report published on the social media platform WeChat, the participants complained that the film excessively glorified the Kuomintang army.

Afterwards, the film's screening at the Shanghai film festival was cancelled. Jia Zhangke, a prominent filmmaker, criticised the decision, saying on Sina Weibo "[things] cannot be done like that for the moviemaking business".

The film was then delayed yet again from its 5 July 2019 release date. Pushed back by over a year for failing to pass the censors, on 2 August 2020, the producers announced that the film was scheduled for release on 21 August 2020 nationwide in China. The theatrical version is said to be 13 minutes shorter than the one that would have screened in 2019 at the Shanghai film festival.

Reception

Box office 
Previews of the film were screened on Friday 14 August, making $2.1 million, then on Monday 17 August and Tuesday 18 August, making about $7.6 million each night for a preview total of $16.8 million. It then made $40 million on its official opening day. It went on to gross a total of $116 million (RMB 803.2) in its opening weekend (including previews), the biggest debut of 2020 up to that point. In calendar year 2020, The Eight Hundred had grossed more in a single territory than any other release, having made $366 million in China. In total, it earned  $484.2 million, making it the second highest-grossing film of 2020.

Critical response 
On Metacritic, it has a weighted average score of 64 out of 100, based on 7 critic reviews, indicating "generally favorable reviews."

Ian Freer from Empire awarded the film 4 stars out of 5, writing, "The Eight Hundred is sprawling, and doesn’t do anything in a hurry — the main title appears 20 minutes in — and there are ultimately too many characters to care about, but everywhere you turn there is fantastic filmmaking, flitting between grand sweep and quieter moments."

Maggie Lee of Variety described the film as "monumental, if sometimes unwieldy", comparing it to Dunkirk (2017) and writing, "the saga does share similar sentiments of survival, grit and triumph in defeat ... it too plunges audiences into both the intimacy and magnitude of brutal war spectacle while immersing them in a stunningly mounted period canvas." However, she also felt that "the character roster is so bloated, it’s hard to keep up with their trajectories — and ultimately, to care deeply. As Col. Xie Jinyuan, whose leadership was the driving force of their indomitable resilience, Du Chun displays almost no range in his performance."

Cath Clarke of The Guardian awarded the film 3 stars out of 5, characterizing the film as an “Ear-rattling, breathtaking battle for [the] Chinese Alamo ... Guan goes hammer and tongs with the special effects, delivering stupendously, joint-rattlingly-loud battle scenes and combat sequences edited to the lightning pace of a superhero movie." However, he expressed that "it’s hard to care much about who lives or dies", because "with so much intense focus lavished on the action, there’s none to spare for the characters’ emotional lives". While Steve Rose, also of The Guardian, asked, "Is The Eight Hundred an exhilarating war movie – or slick propaganda?" in part because, Rose said, "In 2018, the Communist party’s propaganda department took direct control of the entertainment industry."

Michael Ordoña of the Los Angeles Times, reviewing the shorter theatrical version of the film, similarly commented that it "skips over the whole character-development part, along with the logic of many choices and scenes ... Rather than immersing us in the moment as, say, Black Hawk Down does with its unrelenting intensity, Eight Hundred has plenty of meandering downtime spread out among its massive cast of characters. Yet somehow, we don’t get to know any of these folks.” He added that it celebrated "fervent nationalism" or "fetishized martyrdom" and described the "sort-of protagonists" as "more types than actual people".

Accolades

See also
 800 Heroes
 Eight Hundred Heroes

References

External links
 
 
 
 

2020 films
2020s Mandarin-language films
Second Sino-Japanese War films
Films set in 1937
Chinese historical drama films
2020 war drama films
Chinese war drama films
Films set in Shanghai
Films shot in Jiangsu
Films shot in Zhejiang
Films directed by Guan Hu
Siege films
Huayi Brothers films
Tencent Pictures films
Beijing Enlight Pictures films
Alibaba Pictures films
IMAX films
2020 drama films